Rish Point (‘Nos Rish’ \'nos 'rish\) is an ice-free point projecting 300 m from the south coast of Livingston Island in the South Shetland Islands, Antarctica. It is situated at the east extremity of South Beaches, Byers Peninsula, 2.3 km northwest of Amadok Point, 1.3 km southwest of Clark Nunatak, and 1 km northeast of Stackpole Rocks. Juturna Lake is centred 320 m northeast of the point.

The feature is named after the settlement of Rish in the eastern Balkan Mountains, Bulgaria.

Location
British mapping in 1968, Spanish in 1993, and Bulgarian in 2005 and 2009.

Map
 L.L. Ivanov. Antarctica: Livingston Island and Greenwich, Robert, Snow and Smith Islands. Scale 1:120000 topographic map.  Troyan: Manfred Wörner Foundation, 2009.

References
 Rish Point. SCAR Composite Gazetteer of Antarctica.
 Bulgarian Antarctic Gazetteer. Antarctic Place-names Commission. (details in Bulgarian, basic data in English)

External links
 Rish Point. Copernix satellite image

Headlands of Livingston Island
Bulgaria and the Antarctic